Streng (from  "strict", "severe", "rigid") is a German surname belonging to the group of family names based on a personal characteristic, in this case derived from a nickname originally used for a strong or tough person. As a Dutch surname it may also be an occupational family name for a "rope maker" (from  "string", "rope", "cord"). Notable people with the name include:

 Ernst Streng (1942–1993), German cyclist
 Felix Streng (born 1995), German Paralympic track and field athlete
 Lucia V. Streng (c. 1910–1995), Russian-born chemist
 Marco Streng (born 1989), German businessman
 Pekka Streng (1948–1975), Finnish musician

References 

German-language surnames
Dutch-language surnames

Surnames from nicknames